Finnish 5th Division may refer to:

 Finnish 5th Division (Continuation War)
 Finnish 5th Division (Winter War)